
Gmina Świdnica is a rural gmina (administrative district) in Zielona Góra County, Lubusz Voivodeship, in western Poland.

Villages
Gmina Świdnica contains the villages and settlements of Buchałów, Dobra, Drzonów, Grabowiec, Koźla, Letnica, Lipno, Łochowo, Orzewo, Piaski, Radomia, Rybno, Słone, Świdnica, Wilkanowo and Wirówek.

Neighbouring gminas
Gmina Świdnica is bordered by the city of Zielona Góra and by the gminas of Czerwieńsk, Dąbie, Nowogród Bobrzański and Zielona Góra.

Twin towns – sister cities

Gmina Świdnica is twinned with:
 Heinersbrück, Germany
 Lübbenau, Germany

References

Swidnica
Zielona Góra County